Beefeater Gin is a brand of gin owned by Pernod Ricard and bottled and distributed in the United Kingdom. Beefeater remained in the control of its founding Burrough family  until 1987.  It is a 47% or 44% alcohol product (94 proof) in the US, and a 40% alcohol product (80 proof) elsewhere in the world (including the UK). The Beefeater distillery is one of 24 in London.

The name refers to the Yeomen of the Guard who are a bodyguard of the British Monarch.

Production

This gin is produced from "100% grain spirit". The manufacturer has been in business since 1863 and is currently located in Kennington, London.

According to the Beefeater website, Beefeater Gin contains nine different botanicals: juniper, angelica root, angelica seeds, coriander seeds, liquorice, almonds, orris root, seville oranges, and lemon peel.

A super premium version of Beefeater was launched in 2009. Beefeater 24 with its additional botanicals of Chinese Green tea, rare Japanese sencha and Grapefruit peel is bottled at 45%abv.

They sell two flavored gins with blood orange and strawberry, both bottled at 37.5%abv.

History
Beefeater's history can be traced back to 1862, when James Burrough, born 1835, bought the Cale Street-based Chelsea distillery from Rectifier & Compounder, John Taylor, for the sum of £400 and started to produce his own distinctive style of gin by 1863. At first, the distillery continued with the production of liqueurs started by its previous owners, further establishing its reputation and extending its customer base.

The 1876 company stock lists showed an increasing portfolio of gins with brand names such as Ye Old Chelsea and James Burrough London Dry, as well as Old Tom styles.  By spending time experimenting, inventing and using new processes he discovered that blending a particular recipe of botanicals produced a bold, full-flavoured gin, which he named Beefeater Gin.

After the almost instant success of the gin, it was soon made the James Burrough Company's flagship product. The original Beefeater recipe book dated 1895, specifies that nine botanicals are essential (juniper, angelica root, angelica seeds, coriander seeds, liquorice, almonds, orris root, seville oranges and lemon peel) to create the full-bodied and robust flavour so distinct in this gin.

The gin was owned by the James Burrough Company until 1987, when under the direction of Norman Burrough, the company was bought by Whitbread.

Lambeth
As the James Burrough Company went into rapid expansion, there was a requirement to increase distilling capacity and in 1908 a new larger Beefeater distillery was built in Lambeth.

Kennington Distillery
The Beefeater production moved in 1958 to Kennington, London. English still manufacturer John Dore was commissioned to create a new larger set of copper stills mimicking those of the former Chelsea Distillery.

In February, 2013, Pernod Ricard announced that the company would begin construction of a visitor centre at the existing Beefeater Distillery site.

The method of steeping and distilling devised by James Burrough in the 1860s along with the secret recipe he created remains virtually unchanged.

Reviews 
Typically considered a mid range gin, Beefeater's basic London Dry Gin has generally performed well at international spirit ratings competitions.  The London Dry earned one double gold, two gold, two silver and two bronze medals from the San Francisco World Spirits Competition between 2006 and 2012. It received scores of 93 and 94 from the Beverage Testing Institute in 2005, 2008, and 2009.  The higher-end "24" gin has also earned accolades, including a gold medal from the San Francisco World Spirits Competition in 2010 and silver medals in 2011 and 2012.

References

External links

 Beefeater Website

Alcoholic drink brands
Gins
Pernod Ricard brands
Kennington
English distilled drinks